The 1980-81 NBA season was the Bulls' 15th season in the NBA and their first season in the Eastern Conference.

Draft picks

Roster

Regular season

Season standings

z - clinched division title
y - clinched division title
x - clinched playoff spot

Record vs. opponents

Game log

Playoffs

|- align="center" bgcolor="#ccffcc"
| 1
| March 31
| @ New York
| W 90–80
| Ricky Sobers (18)
| Artis Gilmore (16)
| Ricky Sobers (6)
| Madison Square Garden14,822
| 1–0
|- align="center" bgcolor="#ccffcc"
| 2
| April 3
| New York
| W 115–114 (OT)
| Reggie Theus (37)
| Dwight Jones (14)
| Reggie Theus (11)
| Chicago Stadium19,901
| 2–0
|-

|- align="center" bgcolor="#ffcccc"
| 1
| April 5
| @ Boston
| L 109–121
| Dwight Jones (19)
| Dwight Jones (9)
| Jones, Sobers (4)
| Boston Garden15,320
| 0–1
|- align="center" bgcolor="#ffcccc"
| 2
| April 7
| @ Boston
| L 97–106
| Reggie Theus (21)
| Gilmore, Jones (10)
| three players tied (4)
| Boston Garden15,320
| 0–2
|- align="center" bgcolor="#ffcccc"
| 3
| April 10
| Boston
| L 107–113
| Reggie Theus (26)
| David Greenwood (12)
| Reggie Theus (8)
| Chicago Stadium19,995
| 0–3
|- align="center" bgcolor="#ffcccc"
| 4
| April 12
| Boston
| L 103–109
| David Greenwood (24)
| Artis Gilmore (15)
| Theus, Sobers (7)
| Chicago Stadium18,249
| 0–4
|-

Player statistics

Season

Playoffs

Awards and records
 Artis Gilmore, NBA All-Star Game
 Reggie Theus, NBA All-Star Game

Transactions

Free Agents

References

See also
 1980-81 NBA season

Chicago Bulls seasons
Ch
Chicago Bulls
Chicago Bulls